The University of Antioquia, also called UdeA, is a public, departmental, coeducational, research university located primarily in the city of Medellín, Antioquia, Colombia, with regional campuses in Amalfi, Andes, Caucasia, Carmen de Viboral, Envigado, Puerto Berrío, Santa Fe de Antioquia, Segovia, Sonsón, Turbo and Yarumal. It is the oldest departmental university in Colombia, founded in 1803 by a Royal Decree issued by King Charles IV of Spain under the name Franciscan College. It is considered one of Colombia's best universities, receiving a high quality accreditation from the Ministry of Education for 9 years. Along with the University of the Andes, the two universities hold the second longest term, behind the National University of Colombia. UdeA and the Tecnológico de Antioquia have the largest number of seats in the department of Antioquia. It is also renowned for its prestigious Faculty of Medicine, which is acknowledged as one of the best medical schools in Colombia.

The university is a member of the Association of Colombian Universities (ASCUN), the Iberoamerican Association of Postgraduate Universities (AUIP), and the network Universia.

History

Founding

The University of Antioquia was preceded by the Franciscan College, which was founded in 1803 after King Charles IV of Spain issued the Royal Decree of February 9, 1801, allowing the establishment of a college-convent in Villa de la Candelaria, present day Medellín.

The first classes were held in March 1803, in Latin and philosophy. On June 20, 1803, the council of Medellín bought land for the main building and construction started in August. The structure is known as the San Ignacio building

In 1822, once independence from Spain was consolidated, the Vice President of the Republic of Colombia Francisco de Paula Santander promoted the establishment of a new educational plan for the institution and, five years later, president Simón Bolívar allowed instruction in law.

During a great part of the 19th century, the country faced political and armed struggles and the university was closed and occupied by belligerents impeding the institution's development.

20th century

Once the Thousand Days' War was over, the country experienced stability and the university grew. In the first thirty years the university reorganized its curriculum, redesigned some of the buildings, acquired bibliographic material and employed renowned professors.

University City was built in the 1960s with debt and international aid. This allowed the increase in the numbers of both students and professors and the creation of new faculties and academic programs.

Today

UdeA started in the mid-1990s a regionalization program to offer higher education in other municipalities within the department of Antioquia, reaching 11 regional campuses outside of Medellín.

In 2004 the university established the University Research Headquarters an advanced project to promote a qualitative and quantitative transformation of its research system. Through the SIU, the university plans to contribute to society by using research, innovation and technological development for the construction of a fairer and more competitive Colombia.

Campus

The university spreads across Medellín, while University City is the main campus. The other Medellín campuses are the Citadel Robledo and the Health Area. The San Ignacio Building is located in the downtown area. Eleven regional campuses are located outside the city.

Medellín

University City
The campus contains eight faculties, three schools, three institutes and the Administrative Building. It hosts the University Museum, the University Theater(), the Central Library and the Sport Unit.

Citadel Robledo
The campus library is widely known for its collections in veterinary medicine and zootechnics.

It also contains a sport unit with two football pitches, a pool, two basketball/futsal courts and a handball court.

Health area
This area hosts the nursing, dentistry, medicine and public health faculties, near the St Vincent de Paul University Hospital.

San Ignacio Building

The historical campus of the university was declared a national monument in 1982. It hosts seven exhibition halls, ten lecture rooms, one movie theater, two computer labs, one restaurant, one multipurpose room and one auditorium.

Regional campuses
In the 1990s the university started a regionalization plan to increase access to higher education across the department. The university opened campuses in Amalfi, Andes, Caucasia, Carmen de Viboral, Envigado, Puerto Berrío, Santa Fe de Antioquia, Segovia, Sonsón, Turbo and Yarumal, covering all of the subregions of Antioquia.

In 2011, the Ministry of Education gave UdeA the award for the best regionalization experience in higher education.

Governance
The Superior University Council is the university's governing body. It is formed by the Governor of Antioquia who is the president of the SUC, the Minister of Education or his delegate, a representative of the President of Colombia, a dean elected as the representative of the Academic Council, a representative of the professors, a representative of the students, an alumnus, a representative of the industry, an ex-rector of the university and the rector (non-voting).

The Academic Council is the highest academic body of the university. It is formed by the rector, who is the president of the AC; vice-rectors of Investigation, Teaching, Extension and Administration; deans of each faculty; a representative of the professors and a student representative.

The rector is the legal representative and top executive of the university. He is responsible for academic and administrative management. He is not permitted to take another job in the private or public sector. He takes office before the President of the Superior University Council.

Academics
The university has 25 academic divisions at its flagship campus:

The university offers 87 undergraduate degrees, 48 specializations, 41 medical specializations, 53 master's degrees and 22 doctoral degrees in Medellín. In the regional campuses, they offer 126 undergraduate degrees and two master's degrees. The UdeA has also a number of international partnerships, offering student exchange programs and some double degrees with foreign institutions, among them: Politecnico di Torino, Universidade de São Paulo, and Politecnico di Milano.

Admission

Undergraduate education
The undergraduate admission is done through a knowledge test, which is conducted twice a year.  The entrance examination is an instrument that measured some basic skills and knowledge that have been obtained is in high school. It is a general aptitude test and as such does not evaluate the applicant regarding the career you want to enter.

The exam consists of two components, Reading Proficiency Test (Spanish) and Logical Reasoning Test (Mathematical Logic) and is equal to the candidates of all programs except for the Faculty of Arts.

To be eligible you must pass a minimum cutoff score and also be within the number of seats available for each academic program. For each semester, the test is often extremely competitive, meaning that the selectivity in admission to each of the academic programs is very high, in some cases presenting the proportion of applicants admitted less than 10%.

Postgraduate education
In graduate school admission is as complex as in the undergraduate. For general graduate requirements differ depending on the title to obtain and the academic unit in which you want to be done. In general at all levels requires the mastery of a foreign language and there are different requirements such as exams, interviews, proposed work and / or research, undergraduate grades, publications, awards, honors, work experience, research experience, participation in events, presentations, and more.

Research

The university has 228 research groups in the categories established by Colciencias (A1, A, B, C and D). In 2006, the university provided an investment of about $145 billion COP for research.

The majority of the excellence groups (A1, A and B) are concentrated at University Research Headquarters an advanced project created by the university to promote a qualitative and quantitative transformation of its research system..

The SIU supports currently 36 research groups that are classified by Colciencias as categories A and B, working in diverse areas such as biotechnology, chemistry, materials science, genetics, environment, immunology, infectious and tropical diseases.

Along with providing facilities for the development of scientific and technological projects, the SIU encourages promotes interdepartmental research and cooperation with the larger research community.

Student life

University athletes compete in the West division of ASCUN-Deportes, along with 24 institutions from Antioquia. The games at the division phase qualify teams for national competition. The university offers training and has varsity teams in aikido, chess, track and field, basketball, cycling, climbing, football, futsal, gymnastics, judo, karate, weightlifting, swimming, rugby union, softball, taekwondo, tennis, table tennis, triathlon, ultimate, volleyball, and underwater rugby.

The university supports student groups and organizations involved in academic, art, ecological, social and sports activities. Three cultural groups are administered by the university (academic divisions can run their own groups, however). The three are the Folk Dances Group, the Traditional Student Music Group and the Club of Singers.

Alumni
Former students and professors of the university include former presidents Álvaro Uribe Vélez, Mariano Ospina Pérez, Carlos E. Restrepo, Liborio Mejía and Mariano Ospina Rodríguez; writers Tomás Carrasquilla, Fernando González and Gonzalo Arango; and politicians Carlos Gaviria Díaz and Fabio Valencia Cossio.

See also
Altair Digital Communication

References

External links

 University of Antioquia - Official website 
 Universidad de Antioquia - Official website 
 Official site at Facebook
 Official Youtube channel
 Official photo gallery at Flickr
 Official Twitter account
 Official website of the publishing house owned by the university

 
Universities and colleges in Colombia
Universities and colleges in Medellín
Educational institutions established in 1803
1803 establishments in South America
Santa Fe de Antioquia